Rich Fogel is an American Emmy Award-winning animation writer. He has worked on series such as The Smurfs, Batman Beyond, Justice League, and Pinky and the Brain.

Screenwriting credits
 series head writer denoted in bold

Television
Super Friends: The Legendary Super Powers Show (1984-1985)
The 13 Ghosts of Scooby-Doo (1985)
The Smurfs (1986)
Muppet Babies (1987-1988)
RoboCop (1988)
The New Adventures of Winnie the Pooh (1989)
Disney%27s Adventures of the Gummi Bears (1989)
DuckTales (1990)
Goof Troop (1992)
Dog City (1993)
Wild West C.O.W.-Boys of Moo Mesa (1993): season 2 head writer
Captain Planet and the Planeteers (1993, 1996)
Creepy Crawlers (1994)
WildC.A.T.s (1994)
Taz-Mania (1995)
Pinky and the Brain (1996)
Superman: The Animated Series (1996-2000)
The New Batman Adventures (1997-1999)
Batman Beyond (1999-2001)
The Zeta Project (2001-2002)
Justice League (2001-2002)
Firehouse Tales (2005-2006)
Krypto the Superdog (2006)
Super Robot Monkey Team Hyperforce Go! (2006)
Teenage Mutant Ninja Turtles (2006)
Transformers: Animated (2008)
Yin Yang Yo! (2008)
Ben 10: Alien Force (2010)
G.I. Joe: Renegades (2010)
Ultimate Spider-Man (2012)
Pound Puppies (2012)
The Octonauts (2012-2017)
Kaijudo (2013)
Max Steel (2013-2014)
Thunderbirds Are Go (2016)
Shimmer and Shine (2017)
Guardians of the Galaxy (2017)
Young Justice (2019)

Films
Star Fairies (1985)
I Yabba-Dabba Do! (1993)
Hollyrock-a-Bye Baby (1993)
Max Steel: Team Turbo (2016)

References

External links

Living people
American television writers
Year of birth missing (living people)